Strategy Aghmashenebeli, sometimes translated as Strategy Builder, is a political party in Georgia founded by Giorgi Vashadze, who along with supporters left the UNM after a party conflict. Strategy Aghmashenebeli has declared itself as following liberal principles. The party took part in the 2016 Georgian parliamentary election in the bloc State for a People, led by Paata Burchuladze, but only obtaining 3.45% of votes, it could not overcome the barrier to enter the Parliament.

The party was originally named as New Georgia. During the 2017 Tbilisi mayoral elections, the party's candidate was its leader Giorgi Vashadze, who came sixth, obtaining 1.95 percent of the vote

During the 2018 presidential elections' campaign, New Georgia joined the largest opposition coalition Strength Is in Unity.

On 30 July 2020, New Georgia changed its name to Strategy Aghmashenebeli. Its new name refers to medieval Georgian monarch Davit Aghmashenebeli (Aghmashenebeli is a Georgia word which is translated as Builder). Ahead of the 2020 parliamentary election, the party and Law and Justice split from Strength in Unity coalition and created their own coalition, which was also named Strategy Aghmashenebeli. The coalition obtained 4 seats in the Georgian Parliament.

The party ran in 2021 local election as a member of the Third Force coalition. On 11 December 2021, Strategy Aghmashenebeli officially became a full member of the ALDE Party.

Electoral performance

Parliamentary election

Local election

Seats in Municipal assemblies

References

2016 establishments in Georgia (country)
Liberal parties in Georgia (country)
Progressive parties
Political parties established in 2016
Political parties in Georgia (country)
Pro-European political parties in Georgia (country)